John Carlson may refer to:

John Carlson (American football) (born 1984), tight end
John Carlson (biologist), American biologist
John Carlson (ice hockey) (born 1990), American ice hockey defenseman
John Carlson (Minnesota politician) (born 1953), American politician and member of the Minnesota State Senate
John Carlson (radio host) (born 1959), talk radio host on KOMO in Seattle, Washington
John Carlson (sportscaster) (1933/4–2016), former American sportscaster
John F. Carlson (1875–1947), Swedish-born American Impressionist artist
John Roy Carlson (1909–1991), journalist and author of Under Cover